The 2009 BWF Grand Prix Gold and Grand Prix was the third season of BWF Grand Prix Gold and Grand Prix in badminton.

Schedule
Below is the schedule released by Badminton World Federation:

Results

Winners

Grand Prix Gold
India Open (not to be confused with 2009 India Grand Prix which was held on 15 to 20 December 2009.)
March 24–29, Gachibowli Indoor Stadium, Hyderabad, India.

Malaysia Open
June 23–28, Stadium Bandaraya Johor Bahru, Johor Bahru, Malaysia.

Philippines Open
June 30–July 5, PhilSports Complex, Manila, Philippines.

Thailand Open
July 21–26, Nimibutr National Stadium, Bangkok, Thailand.

Macau Open
August 18–23, Tap Seac Multi-sports Pavilion, Macau.

Chinese Taipei Open
August 25–August 30, Taipei County Shinjuang Stadium, Taipei, Republic of China (Taiwan).

Grand Prix
German Open
February 24–March 1, RWE Rhein-Ruhr Sporthalle, Mülheim, Germany.

U.S. Open
July 7–12, Orange County Badminton Club, Los Angeles, United States.

Australian Open
July 22–26, Melbourne Sports and Aquatic Centre, Melbourne, Australia.

New Zealand Open
July 28–August 1, North Shore Events Centre, Auckland, New Zealand.

Russian Open
September 22–27, Sport Hall Olympic, Vladivostok, Russia.

Bitburger Open
September 29–October 4, Saarlandhalle, Saarbrücken, Germany.

Vietnam Open
October 6–11, Phan Dinh Phung Stadium, Ho Chi Minh City, Vietnam.

Dutch Open
October 13–18, Topsportcentrum, Almere, Netherlands.

India Grand Prix
December 15–20, Gomti Nagar, Lucknow, India.

References

Bwf Grand Prix Gold And Grand Prix, 2009
BWF Grand Prix Gold and Grand Prix